Nikolay Goredetsky (born 1888, date of death unknown) was a Russian fencer. He competed in the individual foil event at the 1912 Summer Olympics.

References

1888 births
Year of death missing
Male fencers from the Russian Empire
Olympic competitors for the Russian Empire
Fencers at the 1912 Summer Olympics